Paul R. Farnsworth (August 15, 1899 – October 27, 1978) was an American music psychologist. He had a forty-year career at Stanford University where he researched the psychology of music preference. In addition to authoring three books, he was the editor of the Annual Review of Psychology from 1955 to 1968.

Early life and education
Paul Randolph Farnsworth was born in Waterbury, Connecticut on August 15, 1899 to parents Hiland R. and Elizabeth M. Farnsworth. He grew up in Ohio, and attended Sandusky High School. He then attended the Ohio State University, where he pursued interests in chemistry, psychology, and musicology, but ultimately majored in psychology. He remained at Ohio State to complete a master's degree and a PhD, graduating in 1925 under advisor Albert Paul Weiss.

Career
In 1925, Farnsworth accepted a teaching position at Stanford University. He largely remained at Stanford for the rest of his career, aside from brief visiting scholar stints at Ohio State University, the University of Chicago, and the University of Wisconsin. During World War II, he served as the acting chair of the psychology department. During his research career, he studied the formation of music preference. He retired from Stanford in 1964.

He was the editor of the Annual Review of Psychology from 1955 to 1968. He authored three books: Social Psychology (1936), Musical Taste: Its Measurement and Cultural Nature (1950), and The Social Psychology of Music (1958). The last title was translated into Japanese and German, and was republished in two editions, the last in 1969.

Personal life and death
Farnsworth married Helen  soon after getting hired at Stanford. Helen earned a PhD in economics at Stanford and became a professor in their Food Research Institute in 1929. The Farnsworths became one of the first married couples employed as regular faculty members at Stanford. They had a son, Elliott, and a daughter, Susan. He played the violin throughout his life. He was frequently in poor health—in his younger years, he was afflicted by chronic amoebic dysentery. In later life, he had angina. He died of cancer on October 27, 1978 at his home in Stanford, California.

References

External links
 Paul Farnsworth: An Oral History, Stanford Historical Society Oral History Program, 1978.

1899 births
1978 deaths
People from Waterbury, Connecticut
20th-century American psychologists
Ohio State University College of Arts and Sciences alumni
Stanford University faculty
Ohio State University Graduate School alumni
Annual Reviews (publisher) editors